Delta Corp Limited, previously known as Arrow Webtex Ltd., is an Indian gaming and hospitality corporation that owns and operates casinos and hotels under several brands. It is engaged in casino (live, electronic and online) gaming, with the majority of its offshore casinos in Panaji, Goa.

History 
Delta Corp Limited was incorporated as a privately held company under the name Creole Holdings Company Pvt Ltd on 5 November 1985. The company became a deemed public limited company with the acquisition of shares by Finolex Group and the name was changed to Creole Holdings Company Ltd on 2 June 1992. During the year 2003–04, Finolex Cables Ltd divested their shareholding in the company and thus the company ceased to be a subsidiary. On 25 September 2003, the company was converted into a private limited company. In 2007, the company changed its name to Arrow Webtex Ltd. In 2008, the company once again changed its name to Delta Corp Limited, which is currently used.

Divisions

Offshore casinos and casino hotels 
On 1 December 2015, Delta Corp Limited announced that it had been granted a license to operate a casino at its Deltin Suite in Goa. On 6 April 2016, the Government of Goa extended the company's offshore casino license to operate casinos on the Mandovi River until 31 March 2017.

Deltin owns three offshore casinos in Goa. It owns a number of casinos in Goa, namely Deltin Royale, Deltin JAQK, Deltin Caravela and one luxury hotel, Deltin Suites. In March 2014, the company launched The Deltin a INR 4,000,000,000 property which is India's largest integrated casino resort in Daman, named as The Deltin. Since these casino gaming vessels are anchored on Mandovi River in Goa, Delta Corp has acquired jetties (Betim, Reis Magos, Barcolento) and six feeder boats in order to ferry its customers from the main land to the offshore casinos. In July 2016, the company acquired a temporary license to operate casinos in Gangtok, Sikkim.

Deltin Royale: With five operational decks, Deltin Royale is Asia's largest offshore gaming vessel and a premium casino. It offers 964+ gaming positions spread across 50,000 sq. ft. comprising 120+ gaming tables, 4 VVIP gaming rooms, and 60+ slot machines. It has India's largest dedicated poker room – Royale Poker Room. The first-ever World Poker Tournament organized in India was hosted at Deltin Royale.

Deltin JAQK: Operational since 2008, Deltin JAQK, with four decks, caters primarily to the value-oriented segment. It is spread across 40,000 sq. ft. and has a separate VIP gaming area, and offers 431+ gaming positions, comprising 50+ gaming tables and 15+ slot machines. It has a dedicated playroom and a crèche for toddlers. The casino is also equipped with an aqua bar and two VIP suites.

Deltin Caravela (Casino Goa): It is an affordable gaming destination with 217+ gaming positions, spread across 25,000 sq. ft. The company plans to upgrade the casino to a newer vessel.

Jalesh Cruises: Delta Corp owns the right to operate and manage the casino on the first cruise vessel and also the right to operate casinos in all further cruise vessels of Jalesh.

Deltin Denzong: To expand gaming footprint to other regions, they partnered with Hotel Welcome Heritage Denzong Regency to set up a casino in Sikkim. The casino, which services the eastern region of India, offers 206+ gaming positions and is spread across 15,000 sq. ft. gaming area and has a separate VIP gaming area.

Deltin Nepal: They have joined hands with Nepal-based Everest Hospitality and Hotel Pvt. Ltd. to operate a casino in the 235-room 5-star Marriott Hotel in Kathmandu. This is in line with the company's strategy of expanding its imprint in the region. The casino is spread across 15,000 sq. ft. and has 220+ gaming positions, with a separate VIP gaming area.

Hospitality 
Delta Corp currently owns one hotel in Goa and one in Daman:

 Deltin Suites: Deltin Suites is a 106-room all-suite hotel and casino in Goa, with a gaming area aggregating 1,000 sq. ft. with 59+ gaming positions, located at a distance of 5–10 minutes from the popular Candolim and Calangute beaches, it is close to the boarding points for the offshore casinos.

 The Deltin, Daman: The Deltin, Daman is a 176-room five-star deluxe property and the largest integrated resort spread over 10 acres, with 3,00,000 sq. ft. of developed area. It offers the largest banquet facility in the area, with three bars, four specialty restaurants, 27,000 sq. ft. of indoor event catering to Weddings and MICE space, and 8,000 sq. ft. high-end retail space.

Delta Corp also owns a 35% equity share in Advani Hotels & Resorts India Limited. However, this is not operated or controlled by Delta Corp.

Online gambling and games
In September 2016, Delta Corp announced the acquisition of Gaussian Networks, owner of the online poker site Adda52.com and other online games.

In 2019, it participated in the Series A round of fundraising in fantasy sports platform Halaplay.

See also 
 Casino Goa

References

External links 
 Official website

Companies listed on the National Stock Exchange of India
Companies listed on the Bombay Stock Exchange